Jack Gray may refer to:
Jack Gray (basketball) (1911–1992), American college basketball player and coach
Jack Gray (Canadian football) (1927–2018), Canadian football player for the Toronto Argonauts
Jack Gray (choreographer), choreographer of contemporary Māori dance in New Zealand
Jack Gray (footballer, born 1885) (1885–1950), Australian rules footballer for Geelong 
Jack Gray (footballer, born 1916) (1916–2008), Australian rules footballer for Footscray
Jack Gray (impostor), also known as Dolly Gray, unknown American footballer who played in the National Football League in 1922
Jack L. Gray (1927–1981), Canadian marine artist
Jack Gray-Spence (1910–1992), Australian rugby league and rugby union player
 Jack Gray (musician), Australian singer and songwriter

See also
John Gray (disambiguation)
Jonathan Gray (disambiguation)